David Alvarez (born July 27, 1980) is an American politician who is a member of the California State Assembly from the 80th district, which includes Chula Vista, National City, and parts of southern San Diego. A member of the Democratic Party, Alzarez previously served as a member of the San Diego City Council from the 8th district from 2010 to 2018 and was the Democratic nominee in the 2013–2014 San Diego mayoral special election.
 
In 2022, Alvarez was elected to represent California's 80th State Assembly district in a special election to succeed Assemblymember Lorena Gonzalez, who resigned to take a leadership role at the California Labor Federation.

Early life
Alvarez was born in San Diego to Jose and Maria Alvarez and has four brothers and one sister. He grew up in Barrio Logan. He attended local public schools: Perkins Elementary, Memorial Junior High, and San Diego High School. He was the first in his family to graduate from high school and college. He graduated with honors from San Diego State University. Alvarez, his wife Xochitl, and their daughter Izel reside in Logan Heights 

He began his career as a social worker and after-school teacher. In 2003, he was selected to the Capitol Fellows Program where he served under the California Secretary of State. After his return to San Diego, he worked with a company that develops new opportunities for affordable housing. He later represented California State Senator Denise Moreno Ducheny as a community liaison.

Political career
Alvarez was elected to the San Diego City Council in the 8th district in November 2010, defeating Felipe Hueso with 60% of the vote. The 8th district included the neighborhoods of Barrio Logan, Egger Highlands, Grant Hill, Logan Heights, Memorial, Nestor, Ocean View Hills, Otay Mesa East, Otay Mesa West, San Ysidro, Sherman Heights, Stockton, as well as the Tijuana River Valley.

During his first term, he served as Chair of the Natural Resources & Culture Committee, Vice Chair of the Land Use & Housing Committee, and a member of the Budget & Finance and Rules & Economic Development Committees. Additionally, he served on the San Diego Regional County Airport Authority, San Diego Metropolitan Transit System Board, SANDAG Borders Committee, Otay Valley Regional Park Policy Committee, Bayshore Bikeway Working Group, and the San Diego Consortium Policy Board. He also served on the Board of Directors for Local Progress, a national municipal policy network.

In September 2013, he declared his candidacy for Mayor of San Diego. He was the officially endorsed Democratic candidate in the special election to replace Bob Filner. In the primary election held November 19, 2013, he came in second with 25.59 percent of the vote. A runoff election against fellow city councilmember Kevin Faulconer was held February 11, 2014, and Faulconer defeated Alvarez.

In 2014 he ran for re-election to represent District 8, and won outright in the June primary, drawing 75% of the vote. His second term started in December 2014.

In January 2017, Alvarez announced his intention to run for the San Diego County Board of Supervisors representing District 1 in 2020 when incumbent Greg Cox is termed out of office. However, since he would be termed out of office from the City Council prior to 2020, Alvarez chose to run for the San Diego Community College District Board in 2018. Alvarez was ultimately unsuccessful in the election, finishing second to Sean Elo.

In 2019, Alvarez attended a meeting about an SDG&E project and supported its approval, which may have violated city ethics guidelines on former elected officials affecting city decision-making.

Electoral history

Notes

References

External links
 Official website of David Alvarez

Living people
San Diego City Council members
San Diego State University alumni
Hispanic and Latino American state legislators in California
1980 births
21st-century American politicians
California Democrats
Candidates in the 2014 United States elections
San Diego High School alumni